Bloke on Bloke is a 1997 outtakes compilation album by British rock musician Billy Bragg. It gathers together several outtakes from the sessions for the William Bloke album. Its title is a play on the Bob Dylan album Blonde On Blonde.

Track listing
All tracks written by Billy Bragg except as noted.

"The Boy Done Good" (Bragg, Johnny Marr)
"Qualifications" (originally a bonus track on the vinyl edition of William Bloke.)
"Sugar Daddy (Smokey Gets in Your Ears Mix)" (remix by Grant Showbiz of the William Bloke track.)
"Never Had No One Ever" (Morrissey, Marr) (originally recorded for the Smiths tribute album The Smiths is dead.)
"Sugardubby"  (remix by Grant Showbiz of the William Bloke track.)
"Rule Nor Reason"
"Thatcherites" (Bragg, Traditional)

References

Billy Bragg compilation albums
1997 compilation albums
Cooking Vinyl compilation albums